This is a list of the recipients of the Bangla Academy Literary Award from 1980 to 1989.

1980 
 Dilwar Khan (poetry)
 Selina Hossain (novel)
  (short story)
Abu Mohamed Habibullah (essay-research)
Al Kamal Abdul Ohab (juvenile literature)
Neyamal Basir (translation)

1981 
 Omar Ali (poetry)
 Rafiq Azad (poetry)
 Humayun Ahmed (novel)
 Laila Samad (short story)
 Abdul Mannan Syed (essay-research)
 Abul Kashem Fazlul Haq (essay-research)
 Halima Khatun (juvenile literature)
Razia Mahbub (juvenile literature)
 Sunil Kumar Mukhopaddhay (juvenile literature)

1982 
 Nirmalendu Goon (poetry)
 Akhteruzzaman Elias (short story)
 Ghulam Murshid (essay-research)
 Mustafa Nurul Islam (essay-research)
 Mamunur Rashid (drama)

1983 
 Mahadev Saha (poetry)
 Subrata Barua (short story)
 Khalekdad Chowdhury (novel)
 Selim Al Deen (drama)
Abul Hasna Md Ismail (essay-research)
Mohammad Abdul Zabbar (essay-research)
 Hayat Mamud (juvenile literature)
 Gazi Shamsur Rahman (translation)

1984
 Belal Chowdhury (poetry)
 Rashid Haider (novel)
 Muhammad Habibur Rahman (essay-research)
 Rafiqul Islam (essay-research)

1985
None

1986
 Mohammad Rafiq
 Humayun Azad

1987
 Asad Chowdhury
 Dwijen Sharma

1988 
 Abubakar Siddique
 Mohammad Nurul Huda

1989 
 Azizul Haque
 Syed Akram Hossain

References

Bengali literary awards
Bangladeshi literary awards
Lists of award winners
Civil awards and decorations of Bangladesh